Hobor is a town over  northwest of Jining in Inner Mongolia, China. Previously known as T'ao-lin, it is now the administrative center of the Chahar Right Middle Banner.  Hobor is a crossroads town where roads linking the north of the province pass through the Yin Mountains to Jining and Hohhot (Kweisui) in the Yellow River valley to the southeast.

Sources
Directory of Cities and Towns in World, China:Nei Mongol Zizhiqu: Hobor

Cities in Inner Mongolia